Melanomys is a genus of rodent in the tribe Oryzomyini of family Cricetidae, which is distributed in northern South America and adjacent Central America. It contains three species, two of which—Melanomys robustulus and Melanomys zunigae—have limited distributions. The third, Melanomys caliginosus, is more widely distributed, but may be a species complex.

References

 
Rodent genera
Taxa named by Oldfield Thomas
Taxonomy articles created by Polbot